Snivilisation is the third studio album by British electronic music duo Orbital, released on 23 August 1994 by FFRR Records.

The album peaked at number 4 on the UK Albums Chart, and had sold over 80,000 copies in the United Kingdom by April 1996.

Background
The band released the album at the time of the launch of the Criminal Justice Act, the legislation that gave British Police greater legal powers to break up unlicensed raves that gave Orbital its name. The Are We Here? single featured the track "Are We Here? (Criminal Justice Bill?)", which consists of four minutes of complete silence.

"Philosophy by Numbers" samples Sidney Stratton's chemistry experiment, "Guggle Glub Gurgle", from the film The Man in the White Suit.

"Are We Here?" samples a part of "Man at C&A" by The Specials; the track's vocals are by Alison Goldfrapp, as on "Sad But True". "Are We Here?" is also on Work 1989-2002.

The album was included in Q magazine's "The 25 Best Dance Albums Ever" in October 1997. It also made Qs end-of-year top 10 best albums list in 1994.

Track listing

References

External links
 

Orbital (band) albums
1994 albums
FFRR Records albums